Wilderness & Environmental Medicine is a quarterly peer-reviewed medical journal covering wilderness medicine. It is the official journal of the Wilderness Medical Society and published its Wilderness Medical Society Clinical Practice Guidelines. The journal is published by Elsevier and the editor-in-chief is William D. Binder.

Podcast
The journal also produces the Wilderness Medicine Podcast. The podcast has linked continuing medical education credits available through the Wilderness Medical Society website.

Editors-in-chief
The following persons are or have been editor-in-chief:
William D. Binder (2022–present)
Neal W. Pollock (2016-2022)
Scott E.McIntosh (2010-2015)
Robert L. Norris (2000-2010)
William A. Robinson (1995-2000)
Oswald Oelz (1990-2000)
Paul S. Auerbach (1990-1994)

Abstracting and indexing
The journal is abstracted and indexed in:

According to the Journal Citation Reports, the journal has a 2021 impact factor of 1.479.

References

External links

Emergency medicine journals
Wilderness medicine
Quarterly journals
English-language journals
Elsevier academic journals